Alex Maughan (born April 24, 1995) is an American rugby union player who plays in the front row for Rugby ATL in Major League Rugby (MLR). He also represents America playing for the United States men's national team.

Maughan has previously played for Life University, the USA Selects, and the USA Men's Collegiate All-Americans.

Early life
Maughan was born on April 24, 1995. Maughan attended high school at Arborbrook Christian Academy in North Carolina. After high school, Maughan attended Life University, winning Division 1-A National Championships with the school's rugby team in 2016 and 2018.

International career

USA Collegiate All-Americans
Maughan was selected to represent the United States in the Men's Collegiate All-Americans' (MCAAs) 2016 tour of Queensland, Australia. Maughan made his first start for the MCAAs at prop, in their August 10 match against Brothers Rugby Club.

USA Selects
Maughan was first selected to the USA Selects' roster in advance of the 2016 Americas Pacific Challenge. Maughan made his debut for the Selects on October 8, 2016, appearing as a substitute, in a 62–12 defeat to Fiji. Maughan also made appearances for the Selects in the Americas Pacific Challenge in 2017 and 2018.

USA Eagles
Maughan made his debut with the USA Eagles on February 4, 2017, appearing as a substitute, in the Eagles' 29–23 victory over Uruguay in the 2017 Americas Rugby Championship. In October 2018, Maughan was named to the Eagles roster in advance of the 2018 end-of-year tests.

References

1995 births
Living people
American rugby union players
United States international rugby union players
Rugby union props
Rugby union hookers
New Orleans Gold players
Rugby ATL players